Rodionovka is a rural locality (a village) in Aydaralinsky Selsoviet, Sterlibashevsky District, Bashkortostan, Russia. The population was 16 as of 2010. There is 1 street.

Geography 
Rodionovka is located 16 km southwest of Sterlibashevo (the district's administrative centre) by road. Ivanovka is the nearest rural locality.

References 

Rural localities in Sterlibashevsky District